Crenicichla wallacii is a species of cichlid native to South America. It is found in the Essequibo River basin, Guyana.

The fish is named in honor of English naturalist Alfred Russel Wallace (1823-1913), who collected, but subsequentially lost during transport, and illustrated a similar species (probably C. notophthalmus), which Regan thought might be identical to this one, in his expedition to the Rio Negro and Rio Uaupés region in the years 1850 to 1852.

References

Kullander, S.O., 2003. Cichlidae (Cichlids). p. 605-654. In R.E. Reis, S.O. Kullander and C.J. Ferraris, Jr. (eds.) Checklist of the Freshwater Fishes of South and Central America. Porto Alegre: EDIPUCRS, Brasil. 

wallacii
Fish of Guyana
Taxa named by Charles Tate Regan
Fish described in 1905